Trocadero is a 1944 American  comedy film directed by William Nigh and starring Rosemary Lane, and Johnny Downs, Ralph Morgan, Dick Purcell, Sheldon Leonard, Cliff Nazarro, Marjorie Manners, and Erskine Johnson.

Plot summary 
The film is a fictional story of the creation of the Trocadero night club with the two foster children of Tony Rocadero erecting the club in their late father's memory.  The film is meant to feature a variety of performers doing their act in the club, including an animated character from Dave Fleischer.

Cast

Soundtrack 
 "Trocadero" (Played over the opening titles and played by four orchestras in the finale)
 Cliff Nazarro - "Roundabout Way" (Written by Sidney Clare and Lew Porter)
 the Stardusters with Gus Arnheim and his orchestra - "Roundabout Way"
 Betty Bradley and Bob Chester and His Orchestra - "Bullfrog Jump" (Written by Lew Porter)
 Rosemary Lane and Johnny Downs - "How Could You Do That To Me" (Written by Lew Porter)
 Rosemary Lane and Matty Malneck and his orchestra - "Louisiana Lulu" (Written by Teepee Mitchell and Lew Porter)
 Wingy Manone and His Orchestra - "The Music Goes Round and Round"
 Rosemary Lane - "Trying to Forget" (Written by Tony Romano)
 "The King Was Doing the Rhumba" (Written by Lew Porter)
 Ida James with Bob Chester and His Orchestra - "Shoo Shoo Baby" (Written by Phil Moore)

External links 

1944 films
1940s English-language films
American black-and-white films
Films directed by William Nigh
1944 musical comedy films
Republic Pictures films
American musical comedy films
1940s American films